Chris Beasley may refer to:

Chris Beasley (researcher), Australian academic
Chris Beasley (baseball) (born 1962), former Major League Baseball player
Chris Beasley (rugby league) (born 1983), player in Super League for the Celtic Crusaders
Chris Beasley, actor in Isidingo